The Turkish stage of the UEFA Region's Cup is a Turkish football tournament for amateur teams which represent the Turkish regions. Its winner qualifies for the next UEFA Regions' Cup, played the following year.

History
In 2022, Kayseri won the tournament.

Finals

See also
UEFA Regions' Cup
List of UEFA Regions' Cup qualifying competitions

References

External links
Turkish Football Federation website

 
UEFA Regions' Cup
Football cup competitions in Turkey